Uchi (家-ウチ / Home) is the fourth studio album released by Japanese artist misono. The album charted at #49 on the Oricon charts and remained on the charts for three weeks. The full title of the album is "Uchi: ※Album ga 1man-mai Urenakattara misono wa mou CD wo Hatsubai Suru Koto ga Dekimasen." (家-ウチ-※アルバムが1万枚売れなかったらmisonoはもうCDを発売することができません。; "Home: ※If This Album Can't Sell 10,000 Copies, misono Will No Longer be Able to Release CDs".) The album only sold 2,856 and misono has yet to release another single or album.

Background information
Uchi is the fourth studio album by pop/rock soloist misono. The album debuted at #49 on the Oricon Albums Charts, but only stayed on the charts for three weeks. Due to misono's prior albums being met with low sales, a message was placed on all of the covers for the album, saying that if the album failed to sell more than 10,000 copies, misono would no longer be releasing music. The full title released was Uchi-  ※Album ga 10,000 ure na kattara misono wa mou CD wo hatsubai suru koto ga dekimasen (アルバムが1万枚売れなかったらmisonoはもうCDを発売することができません / If we do not sell 10,000 albums, misono can't release another CD). Since the album's release, it has only sold 2,856 and misono has yet to release another single or album.

The album became misono's second album released under the pseudonym "Me," her first being her third studio album Me. Her first single for the album, "with you," was initially released as a collaboration with rock group Back-On. For the album, misono performed a solo version, omitting both Kenji03's and TEEDA's vocals. Along with "with you," the album had four other preluding singles, three released by misono: "Ho•n•to•u•so / Su•ki•ra•i", "「…。」 no Tsuzuki ~Eien Nante Nai... Itsuka Owari ga Aru Keredo~", "Koitsuri Girl Ai Girl ~Fishing Boy~", and a collaboration single released with Cocoa Otoko titled "No you! No life! No...××?".

Uchi was released in both CD and CD+DVD editions, with each edition containing a different set list of music. Although they did not come from a single, the album did feature two of the songs from misono's second extended play, symphony with misono Best: "Junction Punctuation Mark" and "61-byoume no... Fura Letter Saigo no Hatsukoi ~Copernicus Tekitenkai~." "Junction Punctuation Mark" was placed on the CD only edition of the album, while "61-byoume no... Fura Letter Saigo no Hatsukoi ~Copernicus Tekitenkai~" was placed on the CD+DVD edition of the album. Both of the music videos for the songs were, however, placed on the album's corresponding DVD.

Track listing

CD only

CD+DVD version

Charts (Japan)

References

External links
Misono's Official Website (Discography)

2014 albums
Avex Group albums
Misono songs
Songs written by Misono